Flowery Lake is a swamp in the Elko County of the U.S. state of Nevada. Flowery Lake was named for the flowers lining its perimeter.

References

Swamps of the United States
Bodies of water of Elko County, Nevada